

Transfers

First Division

Champion: Defensor Sporting (4th title)
Top scorer: Richard Porta and Cristhian Stuani (19 goals each)
International qualifiers:
Copa Libertadores: Defensor Sporting, Nacional and Peñarol
Copa Sudamericana: Defensor Sporting and River Plate
Highest scoring: Danubio 9–1 Progreso (December 9, 2007)
Relegated: Fénix, Miramar Misiones, and Progreso

International tournaments

Copa Sudamericana 2007

 Danubio - 1st round (eliminated by Tacuary).
 Defensor Sporting - quarter-finals (eliminated by River Plate).

Copa Libertadores 2008

Starting from Group stage

 Danubio - 1st round (eliminated by Estudiantes and Lanús).
 Nacional - 2nd round (eliminated by São Paulo).

Starting from Pre-eliminary round

 Wanderers - Pre-eliminary round (eliminated by Cienciano)

Second Division

Teams

These are the teams that currently participates in Uruguayan Second Division:

 Atenas
 Basañez
 Boston River
 Cerrito
 Cerro Largo
 Deportivo Maldonado
 Durazno FC
 El Tanque Sisley
 Huracán Buceo

 La Luz Tacurú FC
 Platense (withdraw)
 Plaza Colonia
 Racing
 Rentistas
 Rocha FC
 IASA
 Uruguay Montevideo (withdraw)
 Villa Española

Final positions

Teams promoted to 2008/2009 First Division
 Racing (champion)
 Cerro Largo FC (won promotion playoff against Cerrito)
 Villa Española (won promotion playoff against El Tanque Sisley)

Uruguay national teams
This section will cover Uruguay's games from the end of the Copa América 2007 until the June 30, 2008.

Friendly matches

2010 World Cup qualifiers

References

 
Seasons in Uruguayan football

es:Campeonato Uruguayo de Fútbol 2007-08
ko:우루과이 프리메라 디비시온 2007-08